Catopyrops kokopona    is a species of butterfly belonging to the lycaenid family described by Carl Ribbe in 1899. It is endemic to New Britain.

References

External links
 "Catopyrops Toxopeus, 1929" at Markku Savela's Lepidoptera and Some Other Life Forms

Catopyrops
Butterflies described in 1899